is a passenger railway station in located in the city of Yokkaichi, Mie Prefecture, Japan, operated by Central Japan Railway Company (JR Tōkai).

Lines
Tomidahama Station is served by the Kansai Main Line, and is 33.0 rail kilometers from the terminus of the line at Nagoya Station.

Station layout
The station consists of two opposed side platforms, connected by a level crossing.The station is unattended.

Platform

Adjacent stations

|-
!colspan=5|Central Japan Railway Company (JR Central)

Station history
Tomidahama Station was opened on July 1, 1907 as the Tomidahama Provisional Signal Stop on the Kansai Railway. Trains stopped here only during the summer season, when the nearby beaches we open for swimmers. The Kansai Railway was nationalized on October 1, 1907 becoming part of the Japanese Government Railways (JGR) and the word “Provisional” was removed from the name on July 1, 1908. It was elevated in status to a full station on March 1, 1928. The JGR became the Japan National Railways (JNR) after World War II. The station has been unattended since October 1, 1970. The station was absorbed into the JR Central network upon the privatization of the JNR on April 1, 1987.

Station numbering was introduced to the section of the Kansai Main Line operated JR Central in March 2018; Tomidahama Station was assigned station number CI10.

Passenger statistics
In fiscal 2019, the station was used by an average of 216 passengers daily (boarding passengers only).

Surrounding area
Japan National Route 1
Japan National Route 23
Yokkaichi Velodrome
Yokkaichi Dome

See also
 List of railway stations in Japan

References

External links

Railway stations in Japan opened in 1907
Railway stations in Mie Prefecture
Yokkaichi